Stráž ('guard, watch, patrol' in Czech) may refer to places in the Czech Republic:

Stráž (Domažlice District), a municipality and village in the Plzeň Region
Stráž (Tachov District), a market town in the Plzeň Region
Stráž nad Nežárkou, a town in the South Bohemian Region Region
Stráž nad Nisou, a municipality and village in the Liberec Region
Stráž nad Ohří, a municipality and village in the Karlovy Vary Region
Stráž pod Ralskem, a town in the Liberec Region
Stráž, a village and administrative part of Křimov in the Ústí nad Labem Region
Stráž, a village and administrative part of Mirotice in the South Bohemian Region
Stráž, a village and administrative part of Sušice in the Plzeň Region
Stráž u České Lípy, a village and administrative part of Stružnice in the Liberec Region
Hojsova Stráž, a village and administrative part of Železná Ruda in the Plzeň Region